Carson High School can refer to:

Carson High School (Carson City, Nevada)
Carson High School (Carson, California)
Jesse C. Carson High School, China Grove, North Carolina
Rachel Carson High School for Coastal Studies, New York City